Zach Blair (born December 26, 1974) is an American musician, best known as the lead guitarist and backing vocalist for Chicago-based punk rock band Rise Against.

Before joining Rise Against in early 2007, Blair was a member of melodic hardcore group Only Crime along with his brother, Doni Blair, who currently plays with the Toadies. The brothers were founding members of the bands Hagfish and Armstrong. Blair was also Flattus Maximus of GWAR from 1999 to 2002. He made a return to GWAR as Splattus Maximus on the 2013 album Battle Maximus. He has also been a second touring guitarist for The Loved Ones and was second guitarist on the instrumental band The Mag Seven's album The Future Is Ours, If You Can Count.

Rise Against's fifth studio album, Appeal to Reason, released in 2008, was its first with Blair. He also appeared on the band's sixth studio album release, Endgame, which was released in 2011. Rise Against's seventh studio album, The Black Market, was released in 2014.

As of early 2015, Blair has taken part in playing guitar for the punk band Drakulas alongside members of The Riverboat Gamblers. Zach also joined Punk supergroup Vanishing Life in 2016 and released one album with them. 

Blair currently resides in Austin, Texas with his wife. He is straight edge, a vegetarian and an animal rights advocate and actively promotes PETA with the other members of Rise Against.

Equipment 

Guitars
Gibson Les Paul Custom (Black). Custom made for Blair by Gibson. Single humbucker (bridge), single knob (volume) and toggle switch middle and neck position made into kill switch
Gibson Les Paul Classic (Black) w/Seymour Duncan JB pickups (with Motörhead symbol)
Gibson Les Paul Goldtop Reissue (Chambered Body) w/Seymour Duncan Distortion Pickups
Gibson Les Paul Standard (Black) w/ Seymour Duncan JB Pickups
Gibson SG Standard (Black) w/ Seymour Duncan Distortion Pickups
Gibson Les Paul '68 Custom (Black) w/ Seymour Duncan JB Pickups, without Pick-guard. (White)

Amps and Cabinets
Marshall JCM900 4100 100watt Hi Gain Dual Reverb amp head (with 5881 Tubes)
Mesa Boogie 4x12 Recto Cab with Celestion Vintage 30 speakers
Mesa Boogie custom built Road Ready Cab with Celestion Vintage 30 speakers

Effects and More 
Boss TU-2 pedal
Lehle P-Split A/B/Y splitter
Boss NS-2 pedal
Line 6 Echo Park pedal
Rivera Channel Switcher
Furman Power Conditioner
Shure ULX Wireless Receivers
Voodoo Lab Pedal Power 2 Plus

Strings and Picks
Ernie Ball Coated Slinky guitar strings (10-46 gauged)
Ernie Ball Hybrids .10 - .52
Dunlop Tortex Standard Guitar Picks (.50 .60 .73 .88)

Discography 

With Hagfish
Buick Men (1993)
Rocks Your Lame Ass (1995)
Hagfish (1998)
Caught Live (1999)
That was Then, This is Then (2001)

With GWAR
You're All Worthless and Weak (2000)
Violence Has Arrived (2001)
Battle Maximus (2013)

With Armstrong
Dick, the Lion-Hearted (2002)

With Only Crime
To the Nines (2004)
Virulence (2007)

With Vanishing Life
Surveillance (2016)

With The Mag Seven
The Future is Ours, If You Can Count (2006)

With Rise Against

Appeal to Reason (2008)
Endgame (2011)
The Black Market (2014)
Wolves (2017)
Nowhere Generation (2021)

References 

Other sources

External links

Living people
American punk rock guitarists
Singers from Chicago
American heavy metal guitarists
People from Sherman, Texas
Singers from Texas
Only Crime members
1974 births
Guitarists from Chicago
Guitarists from Texas
American male guitarists
21st-century American guitarists
21st-century American male singers
21st-century American singers
Rise Against members
Gwar members